Zoke Chau G (洲克) is a Chinese manufacturing company of swimwear, headquartered in Shanghai and founded in 1996. As of 2000, the company was among the most visible swimwear brands in China. It is one of the local premium Chinese brands similar to Li Ning brand for sportswear. The company's main factory is in Quanzhou, Fujian.

References

External links  
 Official website

Manufacturing companies based in Shanghai
Privately held companies of China
Sporting goods manufacturers of China
Chinese brands
Swimwear brands
Sportswear brands
Retail companies of China
Swimwear manufacturers